The Soldiers is a singing trio consisting of serving British Army soldiers, whose debut album, Coming Home, was released on 26 October 2009, and who have since continued their singing career whilst remaining full-time army personnel.   Signed to CPW Productions Warner Bros. Records, the trio consists of Ryan Idzi, Richie Maddocks and Gary Chilton.

The Soldiers' first national interview was with The Sun, with a free download of the lead song "Coming Home" from the debut album Coming Home. The song was written by Jake Hook, Nick Patrick and Jeff Chegwin. It was delivered as a free download for 48 hours through The Sun  website as a promotion for the forthcoming album. Proceeds from the single were donated to The Army Benevolent Fund. The Soldiers were also featured in Big Sing 2009, hosted by Aled Jones from London's Royal Albert Hall, with special guests also including Bryn Terfel, Ruby Turner, Amy Nuttall. The show was broadcast on BBC TV on 25 October 2009.

The Soldiers have released four studio albums, Coming Home (2009), Letters Home (2010), Message to You (2011) and the self-titled The Soldiers (2012) and two compilation album Best of The Soldiers (2011) and Greatest (2013).

Members
Sergeant Major Gary Chilton lives in Andover, Hampshire and joined the Army in 1984.
Staff Sergeant Richie Maddocks was born in Oldham, Greater Manchester, and attended South Chadderton Secondary School where he played in the school band, and the Jazz band, plus varies lead roles in school plays and concerts. He joined the Army at the age of 16.
Corporal Ryan Idzi (born 1985) was born in Caerphilly, Wales, and is of Polish ancestry. In 2007, he appeared in season 4 of the UK The X Factor, auditioning with "Lean on Me". He reached the "Bootcamp" stages of the competition. A member of the 1st The Queen's Dragoon Guards, he has served in Afghanistan and Iraq as a member of the 20th Armoured Brigade.

Discography

Studio albums

Special album releases

Compilation albums

Singles

References

External links
Official website

English boy bands
English pop music groups
Musical groups established in 2009
British musical trios
Warner Records artists